The Ministry of Food, Civil Supplies and Consumer Protection is a ministry of the Government of Maharashtra. The ministry is responsible for consumer protection and regulating food and civil supply issues in Maharashtra.

The Ministry is headed by a cabinet level minister. Ravindra Chavan is current Minister of Food, Civil Supplies and Consumer Protection.

Head office

List of Cabinet Ministers

List of Ministers of State

List of Principal Secretary

History
Food and Civil Supplies department came into existence in March 1965. Before 1965, Food and Civil Supply came under Agriculture, Food and Cooperation Department.

Jurisdiction
Ministry looks after Maharashtra. Department works in alignment with the Essential Commodities Act, 1955.

Consumer protection
Department is further divided into following offices for administrative purpose.

State and District level consumer protection : 
Consumer Welfare Advisory Committee
District Consumer Protection Councils
State Consumer Protection Council
Jurisdiction of the State Commission & District Forum
District Fora
Circuit Bench
State Commission

Composition of State Commission
The State Commission consists of 
 five Members 
 one President (sitting or retired High Court Judge)
 one is judicial member (sitting or retired District Court Judge)
 and one is lady member.
 two members with adequate knowledge of consumer protection laws

References

External links 
 

Government ministries of Maharashtra
Consumer protection in India